Lieutenant General  Sir John Rolt KCB, GCH ( – 8 November 1856) was a British Army officer who became colonel of the 2nd (The Queen's Royal) Regiment of Foot.

Military career
Rolt was commissioned as an ensign in the 58th Regiment of Foot on 1 March 1800. He was wounded during the Egyptian Campaign in 1801. He took part in the Siege of Ciudad Rodrigo in January 1812 and the Battle of Badajoz in March 1812 during the Peninsular War, later receiving the Army Gold Cross for Corunna, Nivelle, Nive, Orthes and Toulouse, and the Military General Service Medal with clasps for Egypt,  Busaco and Pyrenees.

Rolt became commanding officer of the 2nd Regiment of Foot in 1823 and went on to be colonel of the regiment on 29 August 1853.

References

1780s births
1856 deaths
Date of birth unknown
British Army generals
Knights Commander of the Order of the Bath